The 1907 Glamorgan County Council election was the seventh contest for seats on this local authority in south Wales. It was preceded by the 1904 election and followed by the 1910 election.

Overview of the result
As in most parts of Wales, the Liberal Party again won a majority of the seats. The Conservatives made a slight advance, notably in the western part of the county where they also held on in a number of industrial wards where the influence of paternalism remained strong. A more striking factor was the advance of Labour candidates in several areas and there were also Liberal members who were returned under a 'progressive' banner with support from the labour movement.

Boundary changes
There were no boundary changes at this election.

Retiring aldermen
All eleven retiring aldermen were Liberals, or Lib-Lab members as the Conservatives and their allies had been denied any seats on the aldermanic bench since the 1901 election.

Contested elections
There were fewer contested elections than three years before.

Aberdare, Mountain Ash and Merthyr districts
There were only two contested elections in the Aberdare district, and both were more personal than political. It was noted that the labour movement did not show the same interest in county elections than in those for the district council.

Bridgend and Maesteg districts
There were only two contested elections in this area and in one of those, a candidate had withdrawn too late in the day and polled very few votes. The contest in Maesteg was a particularly lively one and was influenced by the political struggles in Mid Glamorgan where Vernon Hartshorn was an increasingly influential figure. Hartshorn instigated the candidacy of the local federation solicitor who defeated a candidate closely allied to the coalowners.

Swansea, Pontardawe and Port Talbot districts
In these areas the Conservatives performed well, mainly at the expense of the Liberals and also holding off Labour challenges in Pontardawe and Loughor. Labour took Cwmavon from the Liberals by a substantial majority.

Results

Aberaman

Aberavon
J.M. Smith held on to the seat he had held since 1889 by a far more comfortable majority than three years previously. His opponent, a Liberal in 1904, now stood as a Labour candidate. The result was greeted by what was said to be the liveliest crowd seen in Aberavon for many years.

Aberdare Town
David Hughes, first elected in 1901 when he ousted David Price Davies, and re-elected in 1904 at a by-election following John William Evans's re-election as alderman, was again returned.

Barry
J.C. Meggitt stood down after fifteen years.

Blaengwawr
John Howell, first elected in 1895, was returned unopposed after G.A.Treharne withdrew.

Cadoxton
This was a contest in which the controversy over the education rate featured and the sitting member, a Roman Catholic, was defeated by the clerk of the former School Board.

Bridgend
Randall was returned unopposed.

Briton Ferry
Jenkin Hill recaptured the seat he lost three years previously.

Caeharris

Caerphilly

Cilfynydd

Coedffranc

Coity

On completion of his aldermanic term, William Howell was again returned.

Cowbridge
The sitting member, a timber merchant at Pendoylan, who had captured the seat three years previously, was now returned unopposed.

Cwmavon

Cyfarthfa

Cymmer

Dinas Powys

Dowlais

Dulais Valley

Ferndale

Gadlys
Griffith George was opposed by Charles Vicary who described himself as a 'progressive' and a trade union candidate. Vicary claimed that there were no differences between him and George on a number of issues and denied George's claims that the contest was a sectarian one owing to Vicary being a churchman. George, first elected in 1904, held the seat by a far more comfortable majority than at his initial election.

Garw Valley

Gellifaelog

Gelligaer

Gower

Kibbor

Llandaff

Llandeilo Talybont

Llansamlet

Llantrisant
Blandy Jenkins was again returned unopposed.

Llwydcoed
Rees Llewellyn was again returned unopposed.

Llwynypia and Clydach
James Evans, grocer, elected following Richard Lewis's election as alderman in 1901, was returned unopposed.

Loughor and Penderry
Llewelyn, sitting member and a member of the authority since its formation, was opposed by W. E. Morgan, miners' agent in the Western District of the South Wales Miners' Federation and a well known labour leader. Llewelyn, in view of his status as a landowner and employer, attracted widespread support and favourable reports of his public meetings appeared in the Cambrian newspaper.  At the election, Llewelyn was said to have majority support in Gorseinon and Gowerton, although Tirdeunaw was said to favour Llewelyn. After his defeat, Morgan stated that as a working man he had only been campaigning for a week.

Maesteg
This was a fierce contest between Evan Davies, solicitor to the local miners' union and described by opponents as the Federation candidate and J.P. Gibbon, chairman of Maesteg Urban District Council and a local mineral agent. Davies responded to attacks by describing Gibbon as the candidate of North's Navigation collieries who had not been adopted by any public meeting or organisation Vernon Hartshorn played a prominent role in Davies's campaign and even brought Adela Pankhurst to address his final meeting, something which was not welcomed universally.

Margam
The Liberal candidate, who captured the seat three years previously, narrowly held on. The Conservatives had been confident of victory and the result was said to have been witnessed by one of the largest crowds seen in Port Talbot for many years.

Merthyr Town

Merthyr Vale

Morriston

Mountain Ash

Neath (North)

Neath (South)
At the previous election, Trick had stood as a Conservative.

Newcastle
John Thomas switched to Newcastle.

Ogmore
The sitting member, a timber merchant of Porthcawl, was returned unopposed after the former member, J.D. Nicholl of Merthyr Mawr, declined to oppose him.

Ogmore Valley
David John Thomas, surgeon of Nantymoel, was returned unopposed. A mass meeting of workmen at Nantymoel had decided not to field a labour candidate and to concentrate on the district elections.

Oystermouth

Penarth North

Penarth South

Penrhiwceiber

Pentre
E.T. Davies, auctioneer, had been elected at a by-election following Elias Henry Davies's appointment as alderman in 1902. He was now returned unopposed.

Penydarren

Pontardawe
Having defeated the Liberal candidate by won vote only in 1904, the sitting member, Frank Gilbertson was now opposed by a Labour candidate, Johnny James, check weigher at Cwmgors Colliery. James fared less well than his predecessor, however, in seeking to oust Gilbertson.

Plymouth

Pontlottyn

Pontypridd
The seat was now known as Pontypridd and Rhondda

Penygraig
The sitting member was defeated.

Porth

Resolven

Sketty
John Davies had been defeated in the two previous elections but was now returned unopposed.

Swansea Valley

Treforest
James Roberts had won the seat at a by-election following the death of the previous member, David Leyshon

Treherbert
Enoch Davies, returned in 1901 following William Morgan's re-election as alderman, was elected unopposed.

Treorchy
Thomas Jones, Co-operative stores manager, was returned unopposed.

Trealaw and Tonypandy
D.W. Davies, the member since 1898, was again returned.

Tylorstown and Ynyshir
Sitting councillor Dr T.H. Morris stood down to allow Alderman W.H. Mathias to be returned unopposed.

Ystalyfera

Ystrad
Clifford Cory, the member since 1892, was once again returned unopposed.

Election of aldermen

In addition to the 66 councillors the council consisted of 22 county aldermen. Aldermen were elected by the council, and served a six-year term. Following the 1907 election, there were twelve Aldermanic vacancies.

The following aldermen were appointed by the newly elected council.

elected for six years
W.R. Davies, Liberal (elected councillor at Cilfynydd)
J.E. Evans
Jenkin Hill, Liberal, retiring alderman (elected councillor at Briton Ferry)
John Thomas, Liberal-Labour, retiring alderman, (elected councillor at Newcastle)
E.H. Davies
Richard Lewis, Liberal, retiring alderman (elected councillor at Llwynypia and Clydach)
William Morgan, Liberal, retiring alderman (elected councillor at Treherbert)
Morgan Williams, Liberal, retiring alderman Ynyshir
John Davies
John Morgan
Thomas Jones, Liberal, Swansea Valley
Rees Llewellyn

elected for three years

Results

Aberaman

Aberavon
J.M. Smith held on to the seat he had held since 1889 by a far more comfortable majority than three years previously. His opponent, a Liberal in 1904, now stood as a Labour candidate. The result was greeted by what was said to be the liveliest crowd seen in Aberavon for many years.

Aberdare Town
David Hughes, first elected in 1901 when he ousted David Price Davies, and re-elected in 1904 at a by-election following John William Evans's re-election as alderman, was again returned.

Barry
J.C. Meggitt stood down after fifteen years.

Blaengwawr
John Howell, first elected in 1895, was returned unopposed after G.A.Treharne withdrew.

Cadoxton
This was a contest in which the controversy over the education rate featured and the sitting member, a Roman Catholic, was defeated by the clerk of the former School Board.

Bridgend
Randall was returned unopposed (check political affiliation).

Briton Ferry
Jenkin Hill recaptured the seat he lost three years previously.

Caeharris

Caerphilly

Cilfynydd

Coedffranc

Coity

On completion of his aldermanic term, William Howell was again returned.

Cowbridge
The sitting member, a timber merchant at Pendoylan, who had captured the seat three years previously, was now returned unopposed.

Cwmavon

Cyfarthfa

Cymmer

Dinas Powys

Dowlais

Dulais Valley

Ferndale

Gadlys
Griffith George was opposed by Charles Vicary who described himself as a 'progressive' and a trade union candidate. Vicary claimed that there were no differences between him and George on a number of issues and denied George's claims that the contest was a sectarian one owing to Vicary being a churchman. George, first elected in 1904, held the seat by a far more comfortable majority than at his initial election.

Garw Valley

Gellifaelog

Gelligaer

Gower

Kibbor

Llandaff

Llandeilo Talybont

Llansamlet

Llantrisant
Blandy Jenkins was again returned unopposed.

Llwydcoed
Rees Llewellyn was again returned unopposed.

Llwynypia and Clydach
James Evans, grocer, elected following Richard Lewis's election as alderman in 1901, was returned unopposed.

Loughor and Penderry
Llewelyn, sitting member and a member of the authority since its formation, was opposed by W.E. Morgan, miners' agent in the Western District of the South Wales Miners' Federation and a well known labour leader. Llewelyn, in view of his status as a landowner and employer, attracted widespread support and favourable reports of his public meetings appeared in the Cambrian newspaper.  At the election, Llewelyn was said to have majority support in Gorseinon and Gowerton, although Tirdeunaw was said to favour Llewelyn. After his defeat, Morgan stated that as a working man he had only been campaigning for a week.

Maesteg
This was a fierce contest between Evan Davies, solicitor to the local miners' union and described by opponents as the Federation candidate and J.P. Gibbon, chairman of Maesteg Urban District Council and a local mineral agent. Davies responded to attacks by describing Gibbon as the candidate of North's Navigation collieries who had not been adopted by any public meeting or organisation Vernon Hartshorn played a prominent role in Davies's campaign and even brought Adela Pankhurst to address his final meeting, something which was not welcomed universally.

Margam
The Liberal candidate, who captured the seat three years previously, narrowly held on. The Conservatives had been confident of victory and the result was said to have been witnessed by one of the largest crowds seen in Port Talbot for many years.

Merthyr Town

Merthyr Vale

Morriston

Mountain Ash

Neath (North)

Neath (South)
At the previous election, Trick had stood as a Conservative.

Newcastle by-election
The Conservative won a surprising victory in an election largely fought on the issue of education.

Ogmore
The sitting member, a timber merchant of Porthcawl, was returned unopposed after the former member, J.D. Nicholl of Merthyr Mawr, declined to oppose him.

Ogmore Valley
David John Thomas, surgeon of Nantymoel, was returned unopposed. A mass meeting of workmen at Nantymoel had decided not to field a labour candidate and to concentrate on the district elections.

Oystermouth

Penarth North

Penarth South

Penrhiwceiber

Pentre
E.T. Davies, auctioneer, had been elected at a by-election following Elias Henry Davies's appointment as alderman in 1902. He was now returned unopposed.

Penydarren

Pontardawe
Having defeated the Liberal candidate by won vote only in 1904, the sitting member, Frank Gilbertson was now opposed by a Labour candidate, Johnny James, check weigher at Cwmgors Colliery. James fared less well than his predecessor, however, in seeking to oust Gilbertson.

Plymouth

Pontlottyn

Pontypridd
The seat was now known as Pontypridd and Rhondda

Penygraig
Penygraig appears to be a new ward.

Porth

Resolven

Sketty
John Davies had been defeated in the two previous elections but was now returned unopposed.

Swansea Valley

Treforest
James Roberts had won the seat at a by-election following the death of the previous member, David Leyshon

Treherbert by-election
Enoch Davies, originally returned in 1901 following William Morgan's re-election as alderman, was re-elected after a close fight with another Liberal.

Treorchy
Thomas Jones, Co-operative stores manager, was returned unopposed.

Trealaw and Tonypandy
D.W. Davies, the member since 1898, was returned unopposed for the second successive election.

Tylorstown and Ynyshir
Sitting councillor Dr T.H. Morris stood down to allow Alderman W.H. Mathias to be returned unopposed.

Ystalyfera

Ystrad
Clifford Cory, the member since 1892, was once again returned unopposed.

References

Bibliography

Glamorgan County Council elections
1907 Welsh local elections
20th century in Glamorgan